The Municipality of Sodražica is a municipality in the Lower Carniola region of Slovenia. The seat of the municipality is the town of Sodražica. It is included in the Southeast Slovenia Statistical Region. It borders the municipalities of Ribnica, Velike Lašče, Bloke, and Loški Potok.

In Austro-Hungary, and also in the Kingdom of Yugoslavia, Sodražica was an independent municipality, until the creation of Socialist Federative Republic of Yugoslavia. It became an independent municipality once again in 1998, when it separated from the Municipality of Ribnica.

Historically, the inhabitants made woodenware, especially sieve rims, buckets, spoons, rakes, and wicker baskets. The woodenware was sold to Ribnica peddlers who then travelled around the world, selling the woodenware.

Settlements
In addition to the municipal seat of Sodražica, the municipality also includes the following settlements:

 Betonovo
 Brlog
 Globel
 Janeži
 Jelovec
 Kotel
 Kračali
 Kržeti
 Lipovšica
 Male Vinice
 Nova Štifta
 Novi Pot
 Petrinci
 Podklanec
 Preska
 Ravni Dol
 Sinovica
 Travna Gora
 Vinice
 Zamostec
 Zapotok
 Žimarice

Notable people  
 (1887–1945), composer, organist, and conductor
 (1857–1938), priest, journalist, and representative in the Austrian parliament
 (1897–1986), academy-trained sculptor
Tone Košmrlj (born 1959), founder and the former bass player in 
Franc Mihelič (born 1949), musician and founder of the Franc Mihelič Ensemble
Matija Mrače (1866–1903), translator
 (1875–1937), literary historian, university professor, translator, and essayist. The primary school in Sodražica bears his name: Osnovna šola dr. Ivana Prijatelja Sodražica (Ivan Prijatelj Sodražica Elementary School).

References

External links 

Municipality of Sodražica website

1998 establishments in Slovenia
Sodrazica